Lisa Golm ( Luise Schmertzler; 10 April 1891 – 6 January 1964) was a German actress who emigrated to America and appeared in a number of Hollywood films as a character actress.   Golm made her first screen appearance in the 1939 film Confessions of a Nazi Spy. She also featured on American television, appearing on shows such as Alfred Hitchcock Presents, The Third Man and The Twilight Zone.

Biography
On 6 November 1918, she married Ernest Otto Ferdinand Golm in Berlin, Germany and later entered the United States at New York City on 3 December 1937. She was naturalized as an American citizen on 24 September 1943, when a resident of Los Angeles.

Death
Golm died on 6 January 1964, aged 72, in Tel Aviv, Israel from a neoplasm (or tumour). She was buried in the Haifa Cemetery in Israel. She was survived by her sister, Jennie Schmerzler.

Selected filmography

 Confessions of a Nazi Spy (1939)
 Escape (1940)
 So Ends Our Night (1941)
 Journey for Margaret (1942)
 Woman of the Year (1942)
 Calling Dr. Death (1943)
 Chetniks! The Fighting Guerrillas (1943)
 Mission to Moscow (1943)
 Above Suspicion (1943)
 Madame Curie (1943)
 The Seventh Cross (1944)
 Shadow of a Woman (1946)
 Without Reservations (1946)
 High Wall (1947)
 Possessed (1947)
 Cry Wolf (1947)
 A Foreign Affair (1948)
 Homecoming (1948)
 Little Women (1949)
 Anna Lucasta (1949)
 The Great Sinner (1949)
 The Doctor and the Girl (1949)
 The Great Gatsby (1949)
 East Side, West Side (1949)
 The Happy Years (1950)
 The Hoodlum (1951)
 Payment on Demand (1951)
 A Place in the Sun (1951)
 The Blue Veil (1951)
 Come Back, Little Sheba (1952)
My Pal Gus (1952)
 Invitation (1952)
 The Merry Widow (1952)
 Bad for Each Other (1953)
 Ride the High Iron (1956)
 Monkey on My Back (1957)

References

Bibliography
 Andreychuk, Ed. Burt Lancaster: A Filmography and Biography. McFarland, 2015.
 Capua, Michelangelo. Janet Leigh: A Biography. McFarland, 2013.
 Keaney, Michael F. Film Noir Guide: 745 Films of the Classic Era, 1940-1959. McFarland, 2003.
 McLaughlin, Robert. We'll Always Have the Movies: American Cinema during World War II. University Press of Kentucky, 2006.

External links

1891 births
1964 deaths
German film actresses
German television actresses
People from Berlin
German emigrants to the United States
People who emigrated to escape Nazism